The Dodge Viper (SR II) is the second generation of the Dodge Viper sports car, manufactured by American automobile manufacturer Dodge. The car had many parts carried over from the previous generation.

Production and specification history 

The 1996 model year marked as the start of production for the second generation of the Viper, called the SRII. The car was essentially an updated version of the first generation of the Viper, since most of its parts were passed on to this generation.

The RT/10 received minor changes, the biggest change being the exhaust position. A removable hardtop was now available along with a sliding glass window.

A new model of the Viper was introduced in late 1996. Known as the GTS, the car was essentially a coupé and more powerful version of the RT/10. The roof of the car was shaped in such a way that drivers were able to fit their helmets during track days. This was dubbed the double-bubble, and has been used for all of the subsequent generations of the Viper following the SR II. The GTS was also the first Viper to receive airbags.

In 1997 and 1998 model years the Viper  would continue to receive minor updates.

The 1999 model year introduced the Connolly "Cognac" interior option.  

Lighter hyper-eutectic pistons and factory frame improvements were made for the Viper in 2000, as well as another camshaft revision.  The lighter pistons, being of cast construction, are not able to safely withstand high levels of forced induction compared to the earlier forged pistons.  This difference has led to enthusiasts sometimes referring to the 2000-02 model years as "creampuff cars".  

In 2001 the Viper was equipped with an Anti-lock braking system as well as revised front brakes.

Hot Rod Magazine test results in December 1997:

0-: 1.6 sec

0-: 4.3 sec

0-: 6.6 sec

0-: 9.1 sec

0-: 13.5 sec

0-: 12.4 sec @ 115.0 mph

: 11.9 sec

Special editions

ACR 
The Viper ACR was introduced in 1999, as an optional performance package. The package included a revised air intake, removal of the air conditioning and radio, and adjustable suspension. The car also included unique 18-inch BBS wheels along with interior updates and power windows. Power output of 460 hp (343 kW; 466 PS) and 500 lb⋅ft (678 N⋅m) for all ACR models.

GT2 Champion Edition 
In order to commemorate the car's 1997 FIA GT Championship GT2 class win, Dodge built the Viper GT2 Champion Edition (also incorrectly referred as GTS-R due to adapting many of the race car's visual features), a special edition taking the name of its racing counterpart's class. The bodywork was made similar to that of the Chrysler Viper GTS-R, including the colors, aerodynamics package, and visual design in order to publicize the Viper's motorsport achievement. 100 cars were produced. Contrary to popular belief, the car was not built to meet any homologation requirements, as the race car came first.

Motorsport 

In 1996, Dodge constructed a race car along with English racing team Reynard Motorsport and French racing team Oreca for GT class in LeMans called the Viper GTS-R. The result would end up in a race car that would race 12 years in motorsport with 163 wins in 262 races completed.

The car was unveiled in the same year at the IMSA GT Championship, with racing team Canaska Southwind. Competing in the GTS-1 class (the highest of classes at the time), its first race was at the 24 Hours of Daytona, with a finish at the 29th position. It would fare much better in the following races, finishing at 12th position at the 12 Hours of Sebring. The team would switch to GTS-2 afterwards however, after achieving no further improvements.

Oreca and Canaska Southwind entered the 24 Hours of Le Mans, with three of the four entrants finishing the race, the Canaska Southwind car performing the best at the 10th place. Both teams would return to their respective series, Oreca concluding the year with an eighth place at Brands Hatch, ninth at Spa, and sixth at Nogaro in the BPR Global GT Series, and Canaska Southwind concluding their season second in class at Mosport and sixth overall.

For 1999 and 2000, Oreca expanded greatly, racing in both the ALMS and FIA GT Championship series respectively, earning them nine wins, one of them won by a racing team ran by Paul Belmondo. Oreca would win the championships. Meanwhile, at the FIA GT Championship, a team named Chamberlain had improved to finish second overall.

Oreca would go on to win their second consecutive win later at the 24 Hours of Le Mans, with the top six positions in every class being taken by various GTS-Rs driven by Oreca and other teams. Oreca would leave the series in 1999, in favour of the ALMS, leaving the privateers to race there. The remaining Viper racing teams were still competitive with four race wins, but they would lose to the Lister racing teams, and their Lister Storm race cars, with them winning five races.

The GTS-R would make its first appearance in the FFSA GT Championship, and would see the first overall win for Zakspeed in the 24 Hours of Nürburgring. The three other teams DDO, ART, and MMI teams would win a total of eight victories.

In 2003, the winning ways of the GTS-R would fade away, as the dominance of the Prodrive-built Ferrari 550 GTS race cars would rise. 2004 oversaw the Viper GTS-R begin to phase out, and the car would eventually diminish entirely from competition by 2007 and 2008.

A modified Dodge Viper GTS-ACR driven by Greg Crick under the team Crickcars.com entered the 2006 Australian GT Championship and won the series, with 713 points in total.

Gallery

References 

Viper SR II
Sports cars
Cars introduced in 1995